Cerovec ( or) is a dispersed settlement in the hills northeast of Šentjanž in the Municipality of Sevnica in central Slovenia. The area is part of the historical region of Styria. The municipality is now included in the Lower Sava Statistical Region. The settlement includes the hamlets of Podglina, Trebelno, Bajnof, Grič, Lesičjek, Veliki Vrh, Hom, and Pekel.

References

External links
 Cerovec at Geopedia

Populated places in the Municipality of Sevnica